Regional elections were held in some regions of Italy during 1973. These included:

Aosta Valley on 10 June
Friuli-Venezia Giulia on 17 June
Trentino-Alto Adige on 18 November

Elections in Italian regions
1973 elections in Italy